Lucky Summer Ward is a ward in Ruaraka Constituency, Nairobi County, Kenya. It has a population of around 30,000 people and covers 1.95 km2.

Fredrick Otieno (Bossy) represents the ward on the Nairobi City County Assembly, and Jeremiah Mauti is the Ward Administrator. It was formerly part of the Kasarani constituency.

References

Wards in Nairobi